Weems Oliver Baskin III (March 9, 1936 – February 12, 2018) was an American politician in the state of South Carolina. He served in the South Carolina House of Representatives from 1972 to 1974, representing Richland County. He attended the University of South Carolina.

He died on February 12, 2018.

References

1936 births
2018 deaths
Democratic Party members of the South Carolina House of Representatives
Politicians from Columbia, South Carolina
University of South Carolina alumni